Rufus ("Red") was a first-century Christian mentioned in  with his brother Alexander, whose father "Simon a Cyrenian" was compelled to help carry the cross on which the Lord Jesus Christ was crucified. "And they compel one Simon a Cyrenian, who passed by, coming out of the country, the father of Alexander and Rufus, to bear his cross."

See also
Rufus of Thebes

References

Christian saints from the New Testament
Gospel of Mark
People in the canonical gospels
People in the Pauline epistles
Epistle to the Romans